Vitali Yuryevich Stezhko (born 29 January 1997) is a Russian football player. He plays for Yenisey Krasnoyarsk.

Club career
He made his debut in the Russian Professional Football League for FC Krasnodar-2 on 28 March 2015 in a game against FC Torpedo Armavir. He made his Russian Football National League debut for Krasnodar-2 on 25 August 2019 in a game against FC Neftekhimik Nizhnekamsk.

He made his Russian Premier League debut for Krasnodar on 15 May 2022 against CSKA Moscow.

Career statistics

References

External links
 
 
 

1997 births
People from Vyselkovsky District
Sportspeople from Krasnodar Krai
Living people
Russian footballers
Association football defenders
Russia youth international footballers
FC Krasnodar players
FC Krasnodar-2 players
FC Pyunik players
FC Yenisey Krasnoyarsk players
Russian Second League players
Russian First League players
Armenian Premier League players
Russian Premier League players
Russian expatriate footballers
Expatriate footballers in Armenia
Russian expatriate sportspeople in Armenia